Jean-Pierre Montagny (31 July 1789 – 1862) was a French medallist and coiner, one of the most notable such figures in the 19th century Monnaie de Paris.

He was born at Saint-Étienne and studied under his father Clément Montagny and under Cartellier. He produced several coins and medals in bronze, copper and tin on the main events in French history from 1800 to 1850, such as the inauguration of the July Column in 1840, with his most intense production being designs relating to the 1848 Revolution.  He died in Belleville.

References

External links
Jean-Pierre Montagny at multicollec.net 
http://www.inumis.com/medals/books/vivatrex/indexes-fr.html
 

1789 births
1862 deaths
Coin designers
French medallists